The Tui Sports was a New Zealand light aircraft of the 1930s.

The Tui Sports was a small single seat aerobatic single bay biplane of fabric covered wooden construction with a highly streamlined circular section fuselage.  It was powered by a Szekely 3 cylinder engine.  The Tui Sports was built by Fred North at Dannevirke and first flown by Allan McGruer from a field near Whenuapai on 4 January 1934.  It was named after the highly maneuverable Tui bird.   The silver and gold Tui became very popular, being used for aero club flying and airline pilot training. Originally intended as a one off homebuilt, its success encouraged Fred North and the Dominion Aircraft Company to prepare for production in Auckland, however New Zealand's declaration of war against Germany on 3 September 1939 resulted in these plans being postponed and latter scrapped.  The Tui Sports crashed on Ōhope beach in 1941.  As of 2006 it is undergoing a slow rebuild  at the Museum of Transport and Technology.

Aircraft manufactured in New Zealand
1930s New Zealand sport aircraft
Dannevirke
Biplanes
Aircraft first flown in 1934
Single-engined tractor aircraft